Al Murray's Happy Hour is a chat show presented by comedian Al Murray and produced by Avalon Television that aired on ITV1.

Episodes

Series 1

Series 2

Series 3

Notes

External links

Lists of British non-fiction television series episodes
Lists of British comedy television series episodes